The 2016 Úrvalsdeild karla, also known as Pepsi-deild karla for sponsorship reasons, was the 105th season of top-flight Icelandic football. Twelve teams contested the league, including the defending champions FH, who won their seventh league title in 2015.

The season started on 1 May 2016 and concluded on 1 October 2016.

On 19 September 2016, Breiðablik drew 1–1 with ÍBV. This result meant FH clinched their 8th Icelandic title.

Teams

The 2016 Úrvalsdeild was contested by twelve clubs, ten of which played in the division the previous year and two teams promoted from 1. deild karla. The changes from the 2015 campaign were:
 Leiknir Reykjavík and Keflavík were relegated from the 2015 Úrvalsdeild to the 1. deild karla.
 Víkingur Ólafsvík and Þróttur Reykjavík were promoted from the 1. deild karla to the 2016 Úrvalsdeild.

Club information

League table

Results

Season statistics

Top scorers

References

External links
 IcelandFootball.net - Championship 2016 

Úrvalsdeild karla (football) seasons
1
Iceland
Iceland